Clotilde Pérez García (January 9, 1917 - May 23, 2003) was a Mexican-American physician, activist, author, and educator.

Early life 
García was born on January 9, 1917, in Ciudad Victoria, Tamaulipas, Mexico. Her father was college professor José García and her mother was school teacher Faustina Pérez García. García had six siblings, among them Hector P. García, who became a civil rights activist. She was the fourth of the seven children.

The same year García was born her family fled the violence of the Mexican Revolution, eventually settling in Mercedes, Texas, in 1918, where they had other family. Her parents opened a dry goods store. They continued to emphasize the importance of learning, and enriched their children's schoolwork with additional studies in the evenings. Their father encouraged them to become doctors, because, as García recalled: “[H]e said it was the only way you could be independent and serve humanity.’’ Ultimately, six of the seven siblings studies medicine.

Post-secondary schooling did not come all at once for García, however. In 1934 she graduated from Mercedes High School. García received an associate degree in 1936 from Edinburg Junior College (now part of the University of Texas Rio Grande Valley), then attended the University of Texas in Austin, graduating with a bachelor's degree in pre-med, zoology, and chemistry in 1938. She then returned home to support her family by teaching at several schools in South Texas through the 1940s. She later returned to study at the University of Texas, earning a master's in education in 1950.

Medical career 
García graduated from the University of Texas Medical Branch at Galveston in 1954—one of only seven women and the only Mexican-American woman in her class. She completed her internship at Corpus Christi Memorial Hospital and then opened a private practice. She retired from medicine in 1994.

History and genealogy 
García studied and promoted South Texas history and Hispanic genealogy. In recognition of her efforts, in 1990 she was awarded the Royal American Order of Isabella the Catholic by Juan Carlos I of Spain.

García published a translated account of the 1812 Siege of Camargo, and eight other books on local historical figures such as José Nicolás Ballí, Blas María de la Garza Falcón and Enrique Villareal. In 1987 she co-founded and served as the first president of the Spanish American Genealogical Association.

References 

1917 births
2003 deaths
People from Ciudad Victoria
Mexican emigrants to the United States
People from Mercedes, Texas
20th-century American physicians
20th-century American women physicians
Activists from Texas
Physicians from Texas
University of Texas at Austin alumni
University of Texas Medical Branch alumni
Recipients of the Order of Isabella the Catholic
21st-century American women